Mountfort is a surname and may be:

 Benjamin Mountfort (1825–1898), English-born New Zealand architect
 Guy Mountfort (1905–2003), English advertising executive, amateur ornithologist and conservationist
 William de Mountfort (13th c.), English medieval canon law scholar, singer, churchman, and university chancellor
 William Mountfort (disambiguation)